Jean Gibson (1927–1991) was a British artist known for her abstract sculptures, often in resin, fibreglass or perspex.

Biography
Gibson was born in Stoke on Trent and studied at the Wimbledon School of Art in London and then at the Royal College of Art, RCA, between 1954 and 1957. At the RCA Gibson met her future husband, the artist Anthony Whishaw. Gibson won a travelling scholarship to Italy, took part in group exhibitions with the London Group and had her first solo exhibition at the Leicester Galleries in 1965 and a second one at the same venue in 1969. Further solo exhibitions included shows at the Oxford Gallery in 1974 and at the Nicola Jacobs Gallery in 1981. In 1977 Gibson began making reliefs on canvas after developing an allergy to the resin used in sculptures. Between 1978 and 1991 works by Gibson regularly featured in the annual Royal Academy Summer Exhibition. Gibson was commissioned to create two relief panels for the liner Oriana. Other public commissions included for the Commonwealth Institute in London in 1976 and for the Tel Aviv Museum in 1976. 

Later in her life Gibson taught the fashion designer Nicole Farhi sculpture lessions at the London studio she shared with Whishaw. A joint exhibition of works by Whishaw and Gibson was held in 2018 at the Canwood Gallery and Sculpture Park.

References

1927 births
1991 deaths
20th-century British sculptors
20th-century English women artists
Alumni of the Royal College of Art
Alumni of Wimbledon College of Arts
English women sculptors
People from Stoke-on-Trent